Megan Ann Reinking is an American stage and television actress. She has appeared on Broadway in multiple shows including Dracula, Lestat, the acclaimed revival of Hair, The People in the Picture and most recently Million Dollar Quartet at New World Stages, as well as featuring in the first season of Boardwalk Empire.

Reinking was born in Ames, Iowa and grew up in Cedar Rapids, Iowa, where she graduated in 1999 from John F. Kennedy High School. She performed in the school's top show choir, Happiness Inc and at Theatre Cedar Rapids. She then earned her BFA in Musical Theatre from the University of Michigan, graduating in 2003.

Career

References

External links
Megan Reinking, Broadway World
 
 

Living people
1981 births
University of Michigan School of Music, Theatre & Dance alumni
American musical theatre actresses
American stage actresses
American television actresses
Singers from Iowa
People from Cedar Rapids, Iowa